Joseph I. Scannella (May 22, 1928 – May 3, 2018) was an American football player and coach of American and Canadian football.

Playing career
Scannella played quarterback at Lehigh University from 1947 to 1949.

Coaching career
Scannella began his coaching career as an assistant at Clifton High School in Clifton, New Jersey.  His first head coaching job was at Oceanside High School in Oceanside, New York. He was the Sailors head coach from 1955 to 1959 before becoming the ends coach at Cornell University. He left Cornell after one season to become head coach at Baldwin High School. 

In 1964, he was hired by C.W. Post Campus of Long Island University to serve as head football coach and athletic director. In four seasons with the Pioneers he had a 19–15–2 record. He left in 1968 to take a front office job with the New York Giants. He was hired by Holy Cross in February 1969 to serve as the Crusaders offensive coordinator but resigned a week later to become offensive backfield coach for the Montreal Alouettes. In 1970, he was hired by the University of Vermont to coach the Catamounts football team. 

In 1972, he became the special teams coach for the Oakland Raiders under head coach John Madden. He was a member of the coaching staff in 1976 when the Raiders defeated the Minnesota Vikings in Super Bowl XI. He left the Raiders to become head coach of the Montreal Alouettes. Scannella coached the Alouettes from 1978 to 1981, finishing with a 28–28–2 record. Scannella's Alouettes appeared in the 66th and 67th Grey Cups, losing both.

Scannella was Sam Rutigliano's running backs coach in Cleveland from 1982 to 1983 before being promoted to offensive coordinator in 1984.  He was not retained by new head coach Marty Schottenheimer following the 1984 season.  In 1987, Scannella returned to the Raiders, who had by this time moved to Los Angeles, this time as the team's offensive backfield coach. Here he would coach two former Heisman Trophy winners Marcus Allen and Bo Jackson. After the 1988 season, he and quarterbacks coach Tom Walsh were fired by head coach Mike Shanahan, but owner Al Davis refused to allow this and the two coaches stayed on. Scannella retired from coaching in February 1994.  He served as a scout for the Indianapolis Colts during the 2000s. Scannella died on May 3, 2018, three weeks short of his 90th birthday.  At the time of his death, he was the last living Vermont varsity football head coach.

Head coaching record

References

1928 births
2018 deaths
American football quarterbacks
Cleveland Browns coaches
Cornell Big Red football coaches
Indianapolis Colts scouts
Lehigh Mountain Hawks football players
LIU Post Pioneers football coaches
Montreal Alouettes coaches
Oakland Raiders coaches
Vermont Catamounts football coaches
High school football coaches in New Jersey
High school football coaches in New York (state)
Sportspeople from Clifton, New Jersey
People from Oceanside, New York
Players of American football from New Jersey